Hudeček (feminine Hudečková) is a Czech surname. Notable people with the surname include:

 Antonín Hudeček (1872–1941), Czech painter
 Carl Hudecek (born 1934), American engineer
 Eva Hudečková, Czech actress
 Jiří Hudeček, Czech cyclist
 Milan Hudecek (born 1954), Australian inventor
 Petr Hudeček, Czech weightlifter
 Tomáš Hudeček (born 1979), Czech politician
 Václav Hudeček (born 1952), Czech violinist

Czech-language surnames